Pusionella buccinata is a species of sea snail, a marine gastropod mollusk in the family Clavatulidae. Found by Lamarck in 1822.

This species has also been considered a synonym of Pusionella vulpina.

Description

Distribution
This marine species occurs off West Africa.

References

 Lamarck, JBPA de M. "de, 1822." Histoire Naturelle des Animaux sans vertébrés 7 (1815).
 Finet Y. & Snyder M.A. (2012). Illustrations and taxonomic placement of the Recent Fusus and Fasciolaria in the Lamarck collection of the Muséum d’Histoire Naturelle, Geneva (Caenogastropoda, Buccinoidea, Gastropoda). Zootaxa. 3507: 1-37-page(s): figs 14–15

buccinata
Gastropods described in 1822